Who Is Muhammad? or The Message is the biography of the Islamic prophet written by Islamic scholar Ja'far Sobhani.

The book was originally written in the Persian language and has been translated to English.

Overview
The book gives a comparison between the diverse attitudes.
It not only speaks about the life of Muhammad but also discusses the diverse attitudes.

Translations 
Sobhani wrote his work in Persian. It has since been translated to languages including English, Urdu, Bengali, Arabic (And also the book was summarized in a book of السيرة المحمدية), Turkish and French.

In 2013 Tahrike Tarsile Qur'an published an abridged English translation.

Awards
The book won the 2006 Iran's Book of the Year Awards in the History of Islam category.

References

External links 

 https://www.al-islam.org/message-jafar-subhani

Biographies of Muhammad
Shia literature